The Burning is the debut album by Crown of Thorns, originally released in 1995 and later re-issued after the band changed their name to the Crown. The album infuses traditional thrash metal-based death metal with melodic black metal elements.

The song "Night of the Swords" attacks Holocaust deniers.

Track listing

Personnel
Crown of Thorns
Magnus Olsfelt - bass
Janne Saarenpää - drums
Marcus Sunesson - guitar
Marko Tervonen - guitar
Johan Lindstrand - vocals

Production
Kristian Wåhlin - album cover, logo
Berno Paulsson - recording, engineering, mixing, producer
Hasse Bergstedt - photography

References

The Crown (band) albums
1995 debut albums
Albums with cover art by Kristian Wåhlin